is a Japanese actress and talent.

Filmography

TV dramas
 NHK

 Nippon TV

 Tokyo Broadcasting System

 Fuji Television

 TV Asahi

 TV Tokyo

Films

Variety, life information programmes

Documentaries

Bibliography

Discography

Singles

Albums

Duets

See also
Hiromi Taniguchi – Marathon runner. Currently the Director of Miyazaki Oki Electric Industry Electric Girls Athletic Club. Her high school senior for one year.

References

External links
 – Ohta Production 
Keiko Saito – Kinenote 
Keiko Saito – TV Drama Database 
 – Ameba Blog 

Japanese actresses
People from Miyazaki Prefecture
1961 births
Living people
Japanese idols
Kumamoto University alumni